Tang Asiab-e Ajam (also Romanized as Tang Āsīāb-e Ājam; also known as Tang Āsīāb) is a village in Ajam Rural District, Dishmok District, Kohgiluyeh County, Kohgiluyeh and Boyer-Ahmad Province, Iran. At the 2006 census, its population was 26, in 5 families.

References 

Populated places in Kohgiluyeh County